The 1998 British motorcycle Grand Prix was the eighth round of the 1998 Grand Prix motorcycle racing season. It took place on 5 July 1998 at Donington Park.
In the 125cc class this race was Kazuto Sakata’s last victory in his career

500 cc classification

250 cc classification

125 cc classification

Championship standings after the race (500cc)

Below are the standings for the top five riders and constructors after round eight has concluded.

Riders' Championship standings

Constructors' Championship standings

 Note: Only the top five positions are included for both sets of standings.

References

British motorcycle Grand Prix
British
Motorcycle Grand Prix